Ādolfs Petrovskis (April 7, 1912 – October 14, 1972) was a Latvian ice hockey player. He played for Rīgas US and HK ASK Rīga during his career. Petersons also played for the Latvian national team at the 1936 Winter Olympics and two World Championships.

References

External links

1912 births
1972 deaths
Ice hockey players at the 1936 Winter Olympics
Latvian ice hockey forwards
Olympic ice hockey players of Latvia